The Hilton Glasgow is a 20-storey hotel in Glasgow, Scotland. It is located in Anderston,  from Glasgow Airport, three blocks away from Glasgow city centre, and close to the M8 Motorway.  It opened on 30 November 1992.

Background and construction

Construction of the hotel began in 1990.  It stands on a site within the Anderston Commercial Zone, an area cleared during the 1960s and designated by the then Glasgow Corporation for "comprehensive development".  Originally the land was earmarked for the second phase of the Anderston Centre complex (early plans show that a public housing tower was planned for the spot where the hotel stands); however, this was abandoned, and the site lay derelict until the late 1980s.

As well as being Hilton's first foray into Glasgow (it later took over the prestigious Stakis Grosvenor in the city's West End, and a third hotel was added to the portfolio in Finnieston), the hotel was notable for being the first high-rise building over 20 storeys to be constructed in Glasgow since its tower block building boom of the 1960s and early 1970s.  The hotel has the largest banqueting hall in the city.

Famous guests

The hotel is notable for having accommodated many celebrities, including the former United States President Bill Clinton.  The local actor and comedian Billy Connolly is also a regular guest, and was born a few streets away in the (now demolished) tenements of Anderston.

When American boxer Mike Tyson had a match at nearby Hampden Park, he booked 150 rooms for himself and his entourage.  Hollywood actor Robert Duvall also stayed in one of the hotel's luxury suites for several weeks during filming of the movie A Shot at Glory, which was shot in and around the city.

Award ceremonies

The Hilton Glasgow has hosted many award ceremonies. Some notable events include:

2014 Commonwealth Games – They were held in Glasgow, Scotland, from 23 July to 3 August 2014 and were the largest multi-sport event ever in Scotland, involving 4,950 athletes from 71 different nations and territories competing in 18 different sports. It was the third time the Commonwealth Games had been held in Scotland, and the 2014 Games were notable for the successes of the Home Nations of the United Kingdom, with England, Wales and hosts Scotland achieving their largest ever gold medal hauls and overall medal hauls at a Commonwealth Games.
2014 Ryder Cup for the 2014 Scottish Golf Awards – It is one of the biggest sporting events in the world and it was the first time in more than 40 years that the tournament had been staged in Scotland.

See also
 List of tallest buildings and structures in Glasgow

References

External links
Official website

Hotels in Glasgow
Glasgow
Skyscrapers in Glasgow
Skyscraper hotels in the United Kingdom
Hotels established in 1992
Hotel buildings completed in 1992